Luis Beethoven Galvez (born in 1964 in Santiago, Chile) is a Chilean-Swedish musician, best known as the member founder in doom / gothic metal band Tristitia. Besides Tristitia, Galvez has also been guitarist and founder of Darkstone, Gardeniathan and Swordblood.

Discography

Darkstone 
La Matanza	- (Demo, 2001)	 
Blood Vengeance - (Demo, 2003)	 
Metalrelegion - (Demo, 2004)	

As Darkstone: Guitars

Gardeniathan 
The Black Labyrinth - (Demo, 2008)
Guitars, Bass, Keyboards, Drum programming, Samples

Swordblood 
Hatecrusade - (Demo, 2005): Guitars
Infernal Battlefield - (Demo, 2009): Guitars
As Darkstone: Guitars, Bass

Tristitia 
Winds of Sacrifice - (Demo, 1993): Guitars, Drums
Reminiscences of the Mourner - (Demo, 1994):	All instruments
One with Darkness - (1995):	Guitars, Bass, Keyboards
Crucidiction - (1996): Guitars, Keyboards,  Bass
The Last Grief - (2000): Guitars, Bass, Keyboards (as "The Dark Avenger")
Garden of Darkness - (2002): Guitars, Bass, Keyboards (as "Luis Galvez")
Guitars, Bass, Keyboards (1992–present)

References

Enternal links 
Luis B. Galvez at Discogs

Living people
Swedish heavy metal musicians
1964 births